Junput is a village in Deshapran CD Block in Contai subdivision of Purba Medinipur district in the state of West Bengal, India.

Geography

Demographics
In the District Census Handbook for Purba Medinipur, the terminus of State Highway 5, which is elsewhere mentioned as Junput, is shown in village no. 383 Dakshin Kadua. Junput is part of Dakshin Kadua in census records.

As per the 2011 Census of India, Dakshin Kadua had a total population of 1,131 of which 611 (54%) were males and 520 (46%) were females. Population below 6 years was 984. The total number of literates in  Dakshin Kadua was 905 (91.97% of the population over 6 years).

Tourism
Junput is a tourist centre. A dry fish centre.

Transport
State Highway 5 starting from Rupnarayanpur (in Paschim Bardhaman district) terminates at Junput.

References

External links

Villages in Purba Medinipur district